Mesembrenone is an alkaloid constituent of Sceletium tortuosum (Kanna) and minor constituent of Lampranthus aureus and Lampranthus spectabilis    

Similar to modern synthetic antidepressants, it is a potent (IC50 < 1 μM) selective inhibitor of the serotonin transporter (SERT) (that is, a selective serotonin reuptake inhibitor; Ki = 27 nM) and also a phosphodiesterase 4 (PDE4) inhibitor (Ki = 470 nM).

See also
 Mesembrine another alkaloid constituent of Kanna.

References

Serotonin
PDE4 inhibitors
Alkaloids